The Airbus LPGA Classic was a women's professional golf tournament on the LPGA Tour, played in Mobile, Alabama from 2008 to 2014.

The event debuted in September 2008 at the Magnolia Grove location on the Robert Trent Jones Golf Trail, with total prize money of $1.4 million. Angela Stanford won the inaugural edition by one stroke over Shanshan Feng, which was televised on Golf Channel in the U.S., as well as internationally.

The tournament was not played in 2009, but was revived in 2010 and moved to mid-May. Heavy rains and lightning delayed and ultimately canceled the final round, resulting in a sudden-death playoff between the three 54-hole leaders: Se Ri Pak, Brittany Lincicome, and Suzann Pettersen.  Pak birdied the third playoff hole in the drizzle to win. In 2011, Maria Hjorth shot consecutive rounds of 67 (−5) on the weekend to finish at 278 (−10) and win by two strokes. The tournament was dropped for the 2015 season.

In 2008 and 2010, Bell Microproducts was the title sponsor; Avnet purchased Bell Micro in 2010 and was the title sponsor in 2011.  Without a title sponsor in 2012, the tournament purse dropped slightly, from $1.30 million to $1.25 million. In January 2014, the LPGA introduced Airbus, the European multinational aerospace and defense corporation, as the event's new title sponsor. The company's new final assembly facility for its A320 aircraft is under construction in Mobile, scheduled to come online in 2015.

Mobile previously hosted The Mitchell Company Tournament of Champions on the Magnolia Grove courses from 1999 to 2007.

Tournament names
2008–10: Bell Micro LPGA Classic
2011: Avnet LPGA Classic
2012–13: Mobile Bay LPGA Classic
2014: Airbus LPGA Classic Presented by JTBC

2013 course layout
Crossings Course

Winners

1 Final round was canceled because of rain and weather delays. Third round co-leaders Pak, Brittany Lincicome, and Suzann Pettersen played a sudden-death playoff to determine the winner; Pak won on the third playoff hole.

Tournament records

References

External links

Coverage on the LPGA Tour's official website
Robert Trent Jones Golf Trail - Magnolia Grove

Former LPGA Tour events
Golf in Alabama
Sports in Mobile, Alabama
Events in Mobile, Alabama
Women's sports in Alabama
Airbus
Recurring sporting events established in 2008
Recurring sporting events disestablished in 2014
2008 establishments in Alabama
2014 disestablishments in Alabama